Capri Leone (Sicilian: Capri Liuni) is a comune (municipality) in the Metropolitan City of Messina in the southern Italian region Sicily, located about  east of Palermo and about  west of Messina.  
Capri Leone sits in the foothills of the Nebrodi Mountains.   
Capri Leone borders the following municipalities: Capo d'Orlando, Frazzanò, Mirto, San Marco d'Alunzio, Torrenova.

History
The town was originally called just “Capri”.  The “Leone” was added only in 1862 after the formation of the Kingdom of Italy to distinguish it from other Italian Capris.  It was apparently founded only in the medieval times and it is known in 1320 to have been in the fiefdom of Count Vitale de Aloysio.  It subsequently passed through the hands of several Baronial families, including those of the Lancellotto di Larcan, the Filangeri di Mirto, the Balsamo, the Branciforte, and the Cordona.  In 1620, it again passed into the hands of the Filangeri di Mirto family.  It apparently remained in their possession until the reforms of the early 19th century.

References 

Cities and towns in Sicily
1862 establishments in Italy